is the 15th (16th overall) studio album by Chara, which was released on October 31, 2012. Cocoon was released in two versions: a limited edition CD+DVD version as well as a regular CD Only version.

The album was preceded by three singles: "Alterna Girlfriend", "Planet" and."Chouchou Musubi". "Planet" was used as the Sony "BRAVIA" commercial song and "Chouchou MusubI" was used as the theme song for the animated movie Fuse: Teppo Musume no Torimonocho.

Track listing

Singles

Japan sales rankings

References 

 	
http://www.sonymusic.co.jp/artist/chara/discography/KSCL-2142

Chara (singer) albums
2012 albums